Jurab Deraz Mirza Beygi (also Romanized as Jūrāb Derāz Mīrzā Beygī; also known as Chūbderāz-e Mīrzābeygī, Jūb Derāz-e Mīrzā Beygī, and Jūrāb Derāz va Mīrzā Beygī) is a village in Karezan Rural District, Karezan District, Sirvan County, Ilam Province, Iran. At the 2006 census, its population was 666, in 133 families. The village is populated by Kurds.

References 

Populated places in Sirvan County
Kurdish settlements in Ilam Province